William Hemmant (24 November 1837 – 20 September 1916) was a British-Australian politician who served in the Legislative Assembly of Queensland  from 1871 to 1876.

Hemmant was born in Kirkgate, Yorkshire, England, to Thomas and Isabella (née Richmond) on 24 November 1837. He worked as a draper in London before moving in 1859 to Ballarat, Victoria, where he worked as miner during the gold rush. He moved to Brisbane the following year, where he established a drapery shop with Alexander Stewart. The Great Fire of Brisbane in 1864 was said by some to have started in the Stewart and Hemmant shop, and the two gave evidence during a colonial inquiry into the fire. Nonetheless, the two built a successful department store and clothing manufactury.

He travelled to England to marry Lucy Ground on 20 September 1866, and returned to Brisbane early the next year. In 1869 he built Eldernell House (named for a settlement in Cambridgeshire, near his wife's birthplace) which is now the home of the Anglican Archbishop of Brisbane.

Hemmant was a director of the Australian Bank of Commerce and an alderman on the Brisbane City Council. He won the seat of East Moreton in the Legislative Assembly in 1871, and successfully contested Bulimba in 1873. He served as Colonial Treasurer from 1874 to 1876. He is credited with producing four badges as candidates for the Flag of Queensland, from which the current badge, a crowned Maltese cross, was chosen.

After he left politics in 1876, he returned to England with his family, settling in Kent. He built a house called Bulimba in Sevenoaks. Hemmant and Lucy had 10 children, one of whom was colonial administrator George Hemmant.

William Hemmant died on 20 September 1916, his 50th wedding anniversary.

Legacy 
The south Brisbane suburb of Hemmant is named after him.

Sources

See also 

 Hemmant, Queensland

References

Members of the Queensland Legislative Assembly
Treasurers of Queensland
1837 births
1916 deaths
Flag designers